Jaffna Fort (Yapanaya Balakotuwa) is a fort built by the Portuguese at Jaffna, Sri Lanka in 1618 under Phillippe de Oliveira following the Portuguese invasion of Jaffna. The fort is located near the coastal village of Gurunagar. Due to numerous miracles  attributed to the statue of Virgin Mary in the church nearby, the fort was named as Fortress of Our Lady of Miracles of Jafanapatão (Fortaleza de Nossa Senhora dos Milagres de  Jafanapatão). It was captured by the Dutch under Rijcklof van Goens in 1658 who expanded it. In 1795, it was taken over by the British, and remained under the control of a British garrison till 1948. As the only large military fort in the country, due to the presence of only government and military buildings within its ramparts, it was garrisoned by a detachment of the Ceylon Army.

With the onset of the Sri Lankan Civil War it came under siege on several occasions and was the scene of pitched battles. From 1985 to 1995 it was under the control of the LTTE during this time the LTTE destroyed several of key features to stop the Army getting control due to the site being used to stage attacks but it was recaptured by the Sri Lanka Army in 1995 after a 50-day siege during Operation Riviresa. It was also vandalised by locals to rebuild houses damaged from the war . Today it remains garrisoned by a detachment of the Sri Lanka Army with limited access to visitors and is being renovated with Dutch funding.

Buildings inside the fort include the Governor's residence (King's House), Queen's House, Kruys Church, the Garrison Parade Ground, Police quarters and several buildings from the Portuguese era.

References

External links

1618 establishments in the Portuguese Empire
Archaeological protected monuments in Jaffna District
British forts in Sri Lanka
Buildings and structures completed in 1618
Buildings and structures in Jaffna
Dutch forts in Sri Lanka
Forts in Northern Province, Sri Lanka
Fort
Military installations in Northern Province, Sri Lanka
Portuguese forts in Sri Lanka